The 2015–16 Segunda División Profesional de Chile was the 5th season of Chile's third-flight football. The competition began on August 15, 2015 and ends on June 4, 2016.

Participating Teams

First stage

League table

Second stage

Playoff Championship

Playoff Relegation

See also
 2015–16 Chilean Primera División season
 2015–16 Primera B de Chile

Segunda División Profesional de Chile
2